Arielle Vernède (born 26 May 1953) is a Dutch pianist.

She was admitted in 1972 to the Royal Conservatory in The Hague. There she studied with Geoffrey Madge.  In addition she studied with Claude Helffer in Paris.

Prizes

Arielle was winner of the Concours Robert Casadesus in Cleveland, USA en winner of the "Zilveren Vriendenkrans" an annually awarded prize by the Concertgebouw in Amsterdam.

Discography

External links
Website Arielle Vernède

1953 births
Living people
Dutch classical pianists
Women classical pianists
Dutch women pianists
People from Bloemendaal
Royal Conservatory of The Hague alumni
21st-century classical pianists
21st-century women pianists